Lamsorti was an Ancient city and bishopric in Roman North Africa, which only remains a Latin Catholic titular see.

History 
Lamsorti, at the site of Henchir-Mâfouna in present Algeria, was among many cities of sufficient importance in the Roman province of Numidia to become a suffragan diocese, but destined to fade, plausibly at the seventh century advent of Islam.

It has three historically documented bishops :
 The Donatist schismatic Antonianus took part (without Catholic counterpart) in the Council of Carthage in 411, where the Catholics condemned Donatism as heresy 
 Felix attended the Council of Carthage in 484 called by Arian king Huneric of the Vandal Kingdom, and was exiled afterward, like most Catholic bishops
 Florentius took part in another Council of Carthage in 525 held under Vandal king Hilderic.

Titular see 
The diocese was nominally restored in 1933 as Latin titular bishopric of Lamsorti (Latin = Curiate Italian) / Lamsorten(sis) (Latin adjective).

It has had the following incumbents, so far of the fitting Episcopal (lowest) rank:
 Michael George Bowen (born Gibraltar) (1970.05.18 – 1971.03.14) as Coadjutor Bishop of Arundel and Brighton (England, UK) (1970.05.18 – 1971.03.14); next succeeded as Bishop of Arundel and Brighton (1971.03.14 – 1977.03.28), Metropolitan Archbishop of Southwark (London, England, UK) (1977.03.28 – retired 2003.11.06)
 Jacques Berthelet, Viatorians (C.S.V.) (1986.12.19 – 1996.12.27) as Auxiliary Bishop of Diocese of Saint-Jean–Longueuil (Quebec, Canada) (1986.12.19 – 1996.12.27); previously Superior General of Clerics of Saint Viator (Viatorians) (1984 – 1986.12.19); later Bishop of above Saint-Jean–Longueuil (1996.12.27 – 2010.10.28), President of Canadian Conference of Catholic Bishops (2001 – 2003)
 Pedro Nicolás Bermúdez Villamizar, Eudists (C.I.M.) (1997.02.15 – ...), first as Auxiliary Bishop of Archdiocese of Caracas (Venezuela) (1997.02.15 – retired 2009.01.17), then as emeritus.

See also 
 List of Catholic dioceses in Algeria

Sources and external links 
 GCatholic 
 Bibliography
 Pius Bonifacius Gams, Series episcoporum Ecclesiae Catholicae, Leipzig 1931, p. 466
 Stefano Antonio Morcelli, Africa christiana, Volume I, Brescia 1816, pp. 197–198

Catholic titular sees in Africa
Suppressed Roman Catholic dioceses